Florence MacMichael (April 26, 1919 – May 28, 1999) was an American character actress of stage, film and television, best known for playing Winnie Kirkwood in the television series Mister Ed.

Early life and education
MacMichael was born in Hagerstown, Maryland, to Mary (née Wahl) and Roy A. MacMichael. She studied at the American Academy of Dramatic Arts in New York City.

Career
MacMichael started out on local radio, local theater and Broadway shows. A major role in the Broadway play Out of the Frying Pan led to her first film role in its 1943 adaptation, Young and Willing. Her later film credits include Woman Obsessed (1959), The Horse in the Gray Flannel Suit (1968) and Welcome Home, Soldier Boys (1972).

On television she played Florence Pearson in My Three Sons (1960–61), Winnie Kirkwood in Mister Ed (1963–65) and Barney Fife's girlfriend in two episodes of The Andy Griffith Show. She also appeared in several episodes of Alfred Hitchcock Presents, and guest-starred on The Twilight Zone (in "Mr. Bevis"), Bachelor Father, Dennis the Menace, The Donna Reed Show and Alcoa Premiere. Also in an episode of ((The Tall Man)) "Millionaire McBean".
 

MacMichael was active in local theater, both as an actor and director. She was the founder of the Sierra Madre Studio Players and also worked at the Pasadena Playhouse.
In the late 1970s, she taught acting classes on the stage of the Pasadena Repertory Theater, located in The Hotel Carver. She taught techniques of method acting.  One of her exercises was to act like a slice of bacon frying in a hot skillet.

Personal life
MacMichael was married twice, first to Sebryn Myers and then to James McCoy. She had two children, a son and a daughter. She died at Cambria, California, at the age of 80.

Filmography

References

External links
 
 

1919 births
1999 deaths
American film actresses
American stage actresses
American television actresses
Actresses from Maryland
20th-century American actresses